City for Conquest is a 1940 American epic drama film directed by Anatole Litvak and starring James Cagney, Ann Sheridan and Arthur Kennedy. The picture is based on the 1936 novel of the same name by Aben Kandel.  The supporting cast features Elia Kazan, Anthony Quinn, Donald Crisp, Frank McHugh, Frank Craven and Lee Patrick.

Plot
A truck driver named Danny Kenny was once a New York City Golden Gloves boxing champion. To help put his brother Eddie through music school, Danny starts to box professionally under the name of Young Samson. He quickly rises through the welterweight ranks to become a title contender.

Danny's longtime girlfriend, Peggy is a talented dancer.  One night while at a dance club with Danny, Peggy is swayed by Murray Burns, a local dancing champion.  Murray asks Peggy to become his professional dance partner, but is insulting to Danny as he does it.  Nevertheless, Peggy agrees and quickly learns that Murray is domineering and brutish.  The arrangement was supposed to be short-term, but just as she is about to marry Danny, Peggy coldly rejects Danny's proposal in a letter as her dancing career is advancing rapidly. Embittered by Peggy's change of mind, Danny continues to thrive in the ring and gets a chance to fight for the world welterweight title.  

In the title fight in which he was winning, Danny is deliberately blinded by his opponent's unscrupulous seconds who have placed rosin dust onto the champion's gloves. Peggy listens to the fight on the radio, which Danny loses and absorbs terrible punishment in the process.  She is so distraught she cannot go onstage to dance that night.  Her career as a big-time dancer ends and she is reduced to dancing in local New York City shows for small wages. 

Danny, his eyesight damaged, can barely see shadows.  With the help of his boxing manager, however, Danny begins working as a newsstand operator where he has many regular customers. Meanwhile, Eddie has become a successful composer of Broadway scores, but his true love is classical music.  Danny persuades Eddie to pursue his true calling and continue to work on creating a symphony about New York City.  Eddie dedicates his first major symphony at Carnegie Hall to his brother, who is proudly listening to the concert on the radio from his newsstand.  The movie ends with Peggy tearfully reuniting with Danny at his newsstand after attending Eddie's very successful concert.

Cast

James Cagney as Danny Kenny
Ann Sheridan as Peggy 'Peg' Nash
Arthur Kennedy as Eddie Kenny
Frank Craven as Old Timer
Anthony Quinn as Murray Burns
Elia Kazan as Googi Zucco
Donald Crisp as Scotty MacPherson
Frank McHugh as Mutt
George Tobias as Pinky
Jerome Cowan as Dutch
Lee Patrick as Gladys
Blanche Yurka as Mrs. Nash
George Lloyd as Goldie
Joyce Compton as Lilly
Thurston Hall as Max Leonard
Ben Welden as Cobb
John Arledge as Salesman
Ed Keane as Gaul
Selmer Jackson as Doctor 1
Joseph Crehan as Doctor 2
Ward Bond as First Policeman (uncredited)
Charles Lane as Al, the theatrical booking agent (uncredited)

Production
George Raft was meant to appear opposite Cagney but was unable due to either scheduling reasons or Raft's reluctance to play such an unsympathetic role. Anthony Quinn played his part.

The tramp who appears and narrates the film is portrayed by Frank Craven as a sort of urban parody of his role as The Stage Manager in Our Town, which he had filmed just prior to this picture.

Box office
According to Warner Bros records the film earned $1,156,000 domestically and $638,000 foreign.

Home media
City for Conquest was released to DVD by Warner Home Video on July 18, 2006 as a Region 1 fullscreen DVD and also on October 12, 2010 as a part of the 'TCM Greatest Gangster Films Collection: James Cagney' with City for Conquest on the first disc of a four-disc set.

References

External links

, "fair use" compilation (definition) from film scenes

1940 films
1940 crime drama films
American crime drama films
American boxing films
1940s English-language films
Films directed by Anatole Litvak
Films directed by Jean Negulesco
Films scored by Max Steiner
American black-and-white films
Films about brothers
Films based on American novels
Films set in New York City
Warner Bros. films
1940s American films